William Fischer may refer to:
Bill Fischer (Australian footballer) (1883–1917), Australian rules footballer and soldier
Bill Fischer (American football) (1927–2017), American football player
Bill Fischer (baseball) (1930–2018), former American Major League Baseball pitcher
William Fischer (baseball) (1891–1945), catcher in Major League Baseball
William S. Fischer, American composer, conductor, arranger, and producer

See also
Vilyam Genrikhovich Fisher (1903–1971), Soviet intelligence officer
William J. Fischer Housing Development, New Orleans public-housing development
Willy Fischler (born 1949), Belgian physicist
William Fisher (disambiguation)